NS-11394 is a drug which acts as a subtype-selective positive allosteric modulator at GABAA receptors, with selectivity for the α3 and α5 subtypes. It has been researched as an analgesic for use in chronic or neuropathic pain.

References

Analgesics
GABAA receptor positive allosteric modulators